Nuestra Belleza Nuevo León 2014, will be held at Las Lomas Eventos in Monterrey, Nuevo León on July 22, 2014. At the conclusion of the final night of competition, Vanesa Montemayor Nuestra Belleza Nuevo León 2013 from Guadalupe will crown her successor. Nine contestants will compete for the title.

Results

Placements

Special Awards

Judges
TBD

Contestants

References

External links
Official Website

Nuestra Belleza México